Lost Themes II is the second studio album by American film director and composer John Carpenter. It was released on April 15, 2016, through Sacred Bones Records. The album was created in collaboration with Carpenter's son Cody Carpenter and his godson Daniel Davies.

Critical reception

Upon its release, Lost Themes II received positive reviews from music critics.

Track listing

Personnel
 John Carpenter – composition, performance, engineering
 Cody Carpenter – composition, performance, engineering
 Daniel Davies – composition, performance, engineering
 Jay Shaw – design
 Kyle Cassidy – photography

References

External links
 

2016 albums
John Carpenter albums
Sacred Bones Records albums
Sequel albums